The "Patagón" tank is a light tank developed in Argentina during the early 2000s, that was expected to enter service with the Argentine Army. It is based on a SK-105 Kürassier chassis with a refurbished AMX-13 turret. The project was cancelled in late 2008 after five tanks were converted.

Development 

In 2003 the Argentine Army defined goals for increasing its capabilities, among them nationalizing the manufacturing of its equipment; the VC SK-105 "Patagón" tank upgrade project was part of that effort. It was planned to convert and upgrade up to 40 vehicles at an expected cost of USD 23,4 million in the period 2005-2009; these vehicles were going to be assembled in Comodoro Rivadavia and provided to the army units based in the Patagonia.

The vehicle is composed of a SK-105 Kürassier chassis which mounts a refurbished FL-12 oscillating turret armed with a 105 mm gun, obtained from obsolete AMX-13 tanks. Both vehicles were in service with the Argentine Army in the early 2000s. Most of the Patagón technical specifications are similar to the SK-105.

The Patagón prototype was unveiled on 22 November 2005; however the project was cancelled in late 2008, as it was considered uneconomical.

Production 
As of late 2014 four units have been completed, in addition to the prototype unveiled in 2005.

Operators 
 Argentine Army

See also 
 Nahuel DL 43 – Medium tank developed by Argentina during the Second World War.
 Tanque Argentino Mediano - Medium tank developed by Argentina during the 1970s, in use by the Argentine Army since the early 1980s.

Footnotes

References

Notes

Sources 
Online
 Patagón: el tanque de fabricación argentina que fue presentado ayer - DERF Agencia Federal de Noticias, November 2005  Online article about the unveiling of the Patagón prototype 
 Argentine Army tank assembly plant in Comodoro - MercoPress, November 2005 Online article about the unveiling of the Patagón prototype and production plans in Comodoro Rivadavia
 Argentina abandona el proyecto de blindado Patagón – Infodefensa, December 2008 Online article about the cancellation of the Patagón project 
Bibliographical

Further reading 
 
 Argentina: Ejército presenta prototipo del tanque "Patagón" - EMOL, Santiago (Chile), 2005-Nov-22 (accessed 2014-12-29)

External links 
 News of prototype unveiling - Argentine Army official website, November 2005 
 of prototype unveiling – Argentine Army official website, November 2005 

Post–Cold War light tanks
Military vehicles introduced in the 2000s
Vehicles introduced in 2005
Tanks of Argentina
Tanks with autoloaders